Fatal accidents to competitors at the Watkins Glen International Circuit during the United States Grand Prix and other national and international motorsport events on a  road circuit (1948–1952), an amended  circuit (1953–1956) and the  Grand Prix circuit from 1957 onwards.

List of fatal accidents involving competitors

List of fatal accidents involving spectators

Sources

See also
List of Daytona International Speedway fatalities
List of Indianapolis Motor Speedway fatalities

Lists of motorsport fatalities at race tracks in the United States
Motorsport competitions in New York (state)
New York (state) sports-related lists

United States Grand Prix